Malay Sheykh-e Ginklik (also Romanized as Mālāy Sheykh-e Gīnklīk; also known as Mollā Sheykh Gīngīlīk and Gīnk Līk-e Mālāy Sheykh) is a village in Tamran Rural District, in the Central District of Kalaleh County, Golestan Province, Iran. At the 2006 census, its population was 1,883, in 375 families.

References 

Populated places in Kalaleh County